Benjamín Casado (29 July 1928 – 9 January 2002) was a Puerto Rican athlete. He competed in the men's high jump at the 1948 Summer Olympics.

References

1928 births
2002 deaths
Athletes (track and field) at the 1948 Summer Olympics
People from Carolina, Puerto Rico
Puerto Rican male high jumpers
Olympic track and field athletes of Puerto Rico
Central American and Caribbean Games medalists in athletics